William Kendall (1659–1696) was an American colonial politician. He was a member of the House of Burgesses for Northampton County, like his father William Kendall.

Biography
Kendall was born in 1659 to William Kendall in Northampton County, Virginia.

He was a member of the House of Burgesses for Northampton County in 1688 and then 1692–1693.

He married Anne Mason, daughter of Lemuel Mason, also a member of the House of Burgesses. Together they had sons William Kendall III and John Kendall, and three daughters.

Kendall made his will on January 29, 1695, and it was proved July 28, 1696.

References

House of Burgesses members
1659 births
1696 deaths